Skysite, stylised as SKYSITE is a document management platform designed for construction and facility owners and managers. The cloud-based drawing management and distribution software allows management of documents related to construction projects. SKYSITE includes features like RFI, Punch List and photo management. SKYSITE’s track, and report functionality is designed to prevent mistakes and delivery delays. The system can be accessed to generate reports for all documents that are shared with the team, deleted, downloaded or marked up and increase the accountability of employees.

Once constructed, facility managers can use SKYSITE to store, access, distribute and manage the documents related to the operations of the building. As-builts, O&Ms, warranties and more can be organized and searched. SKYSTE’s real-time synchronization of documents allows access of current information whenever and wherever needed from tablets and mobile devices. All the building’s information, can be archived, and searched with custom attributes, along with document retention to mitigate risk.

History
SKYSITE was introduced in 2015 to help distribute and manage the ever-changing documents in active construction projects. SKYSITE offers users desktop sync and mobile app that has been designed to add mobility to the industry.

Product
The software allows users to manage, view, collaborate, and distribute encrypted construction documents in real time on mobile device or desktop device. The app has been designed to store all critical information in the cloud, for local or offline access. The app has built-in mark-up tools to communicate issues. The offerings of the app includes improved hyperlinking of construction documents, image and more attachments to a Punch list item and document search. Users can upload documents and files with drag and drop, pictures can be pinned to construction drawings and RFIs can be answered. A sample project aids users in getting started.

Facility management professionals can manage, sync, organize, search and share important information from computers and mobile devices. SKYSITE allows to sync all documents with mark-ups, and annotations, along with revision updates, so that the team can uses the right information to make decisions. The revamped application program interface (API) of SKYSITE is designed to fit to an existing information technology infrastructure and integrate with other project applications. SKYSITE’s API integrates with various productivity tools including, Google Drive Box, Dropbox, OneDrive and Egnyte.

SKYSITE software can be accessed to reduce errors and inadequacies associated with paper-based document management systems during all the phases of construction. The system is designed to reduce information management costs, increase work efficiency, enable secure file access and sharing, and make collaboration better, easier and faster. The SKYSITE mobile app is available on the iOS App Store and Google Play Store.

References

Construction software
Document management systems